The NCAA Division I Women's Tennis Championship is the National Collegiate Athletic Association's tennis tournament to determine the Team Championships, Singles Championships, and Doubles Championships for women's tennis athletes from Division I institutions. Tennis was one of twelve women's sports added to the NCAA championship program for the 1981–82 school year, as the NCAA engaged in battle with the Association for Intercollegiate Athletics for Women for sole governance of women's collegiate sports. The AIAW continued to conduct its established championship program in the same twelve (and other) sports; however, after a year of dual women's championships, the NCAA outlasted the AIAW to gain sole authority over women's sports.

The Division I NCAA team tournament was expanded to 64 teams in 1999.

Pre-NCAA Championships

Singles and Doubles Championships (1922–1982)

NCAA Championships

Singles, Doubles and Team–Points Championships (1982–present)

Source:

Champions

Team titles

Singles titles

Doubles titles

 Schools highlight in yellow have reclassified to another NCAA division.

See also
AIAW Intercollegiate Women's Tennis Champions
NCAA Women's Tennis Championships (Division II, Division III)
NAIA Women's Tennis Championship
NCAA Men's Tennis Championships (Division I, Division II, Division III)

References

External links
NCAA Division I Women's Tennis

Tennis
Tennis tournaments in the United States
College tennis in the United States
College women's tennis in the United States
Women's tennis tournaments in the United States